Romancing the Bride is a 2005 romantic comedy film directed by Kris Isacsson and starring Laura Prepon and Matt Cedeño.

Plot
The plot surrounds a confused bride Melissa (Prepon) who wakes up hand-cuffed to a Mexican stranger who claims to be her husband; she has no recollection of the marriage after having consumed a Mexican "moonshine" drink and having forgotten the events that occurred the previous night.

Cast
 Laura Prepon....Melissa
 Matt Cedeño.....Carlos
 Carrie Fisher.....Edwina
 Maria Thayer.....Kimmy
 Josh Randall.....Brian
 Jen Drohan.....Claire
 Manuel Sevilla.....Esteban

External links
 
 

2005 television films
2005 films
Films about weddings
2005 romantic comedy films
American romantic comedy films
2000s English-language films
2000s American films